The 2008 Boston Pizza Cup, the men's curling championships for Alberta, took place on February 12-17 at the Grant Fuhr Arena in Spruce Grove, Alberta. The Kevin Martin rink won the final over Randy Ferbey's team and represented Alberta at the 2008 Tim Hortons Brier.

Results
Triple-knockout format

Playoffs
1 vs. 2: Martin 7-6 Ferbey
3 vs. 4: Pahl 3-6 Koe
Semifinal: Ferbey 11-7 Koe
Final: Martin 7-4 Ferbey

Bos
2008 in Alberta
Spruce Grove
Curling competitions in Alberta
February 2008 sports events in Canada